Eupithecia scopariata is a moth in the family Geometridae. It is found in France, Spain, Portugal, Italy, Croatia, Greece and on Corsica and Sardinia.

The wingspan is about 17 mm. Adults are on wing in winter, including December.

The larvae feed on Erica scoparia, Calluna vulgaris and Cytisus species.

Subspecies
Eupithecia scopariata scopariata
Eupithecia scopariata guinardaria Boisduval, 1840

References

Moths described in 1833
scopariata
Moths of Europe
Taxa named by Jules Pierre Rambur